Paranaíba is the easternmost municipality in the Brazilian state of Mato Grosso do Sul. Its population was 42,276 (2020) and its area is 5,402.778 km².

References

Municipalities in Mato Grosso do Sul
Populated places established in 1838
1838 establishments in Brazil